Avraham Granot (18 June 1890 – 5 July 1962) was a Zionist activist, Israeli politician and a signatory of the Israeli declaration of independence.

Biography
Abraham Granovsky (later Granot) was born in Făleşti, in the Beletsky Uyezd of the Bessarabia Governorate of the Russian Empire (today Moldova). He attended Gymnasia Herzliya in Tel Aviv. In 1911, he traveled to Switzerland to study law and political economy at the University of Fribourg and University of Lausanne, graduating with a PhD in 1917.

Political career
In 1919 he began working for the Jewish National Fund in The Hague, and was relocated to Jerusalem in 1922. Two years later he officially immigrated to Mandatory Palestine. He also lectured at the Hebrew University of Jerusalem on agrarian policy. In 1940 he was appointed director-general of the JNF.

Granot was a member of the New Aliyah Party and one of the signers of the Israeli declaration of independence in 1948. In 1949, he was elected to the first Knesset as a member of the Progressive Party (the successor of the New Aliyah Party). He was re-elected in 1951, but resigned from the Knesset six weeks after the election. He was head of several public corporations, and sat on the Board of Governors of the Hebrew University of Jerusalem and the Weizmann Institute of Science.

In 1960, Granot was elected chairman of the JNF Board of Directors.

Commemoration
Neve Granot, a neighborhood in Jerusalem near the Israel Museum is named for him. The main street is Avraham Granot Street.

Books (English)
Land Problems in Palestine (1926)
Land Taxation in Palestine (1927)
Land and the Jewish Reconstruction in Palestine (1931)
The Fiscal System in Palestine (1952)
Agrarian Reform and the Record of Israel (1956)

References

External links

 
 The personal papers of Avraham Granot are kept at the   Central Zionist Archives in Jerusalem. The notation of the record group is A202.

1890 births
1962 deaths
People from Fălești District
People from Beletsky Uyezd
Moldovan Jews
Bessarabian Jews
Emigrants from the Russian Empire to the Ottoman Empire
Jews in Mandatory Palestine
Israeli people of Moldovan-Jewish descent
Progressive Party (Israel) politicians
New Aliyah Party politicians
Members of the 1st Knesset (1949–1951)
Members of the 2nd Knesset (1951–1955)
Signatories of the Israeli Declaration of Independence
Zionist activists
Herzliya Hebrew Gymnasium alumni
University of Fribourg alumni
University of Lausanne alumni
Academic staff of the Hebrew University of Jerusalem